Laufman is an Ashkenazi Jewish surname. Notable people with the surname include:

 Dudley Laufman (born 1930), American musician
 Ken Laufman (born 1932), Canadian ice hockey player

See also
 Lautman

Jewish surnames